Robert Devreesse (28 May 1894, Cisai-Saint-Aubin – 1978) was a French priest and scriptor in the Vatican Library. His many works involve ground-breaking achievement in Greek (and also in Syriac) paleography, research into the life and work of Theodore of Mopsuestia and the history of the Patriarchate of Antioch in its early centuries. He was irregularly appointed curator of the Manuscripts department of the Bibliothèque Nationale and therefore fired in August 1944.

Bibliography 
Le Commentaire de Théodore de Mopsueste sur les psaumes I-LXXX, 1939.
Introduction à l'étude des manuscrits grecs, 1954.
Le Patriarcat d'Antioche; Depuis la paix de l'Eglise jusqu' à la conquête arabe, 1945.
 Le Fonds Coislin, Catalogue des manuscrits grecs II, Paris 1945. 
Essai sur Théodore de Mopsueste (Studi e Testi 141), 1948.
Les manuscrits grecs de l'Italie méridionale, histoire, classement, paléographie, 1955.
Les évangiles et l'Evangile, 1966.
Les anciens commentateurs grecs des psaumes,1970.

20th-century French Roman Catholic priests
20th-century French historians
French palaeographers
French librarians
People from Orne
1894 births
1978 deaths